Part 8 or Part Eight can refer to the following:

 "Part 8" (Twin Peaks), the eighth episode of the 2017 series Twin Peaks
 Remembering the Fireballs (Part 8), an album by the American band Lync
 JoJolion, a seinen manga series and the eighth part of the larger JoJo's Bizarre Adventure series.